In probability theory, a nearly completely decomposable (NCD) Markov chain is a Markov chain where the state space can be partitioned in such a way that movement within a partition occurs much more frequently than movement between partitions. Particularly efficient algorithms exist to compute the stationary distribution of Markov chains with this property.

Definition

Ando and Fisher define a completely decomposable matrix as one where "an identical rearrangement of rows and columns leaves a set of square submatrices on the principal diagonal and zeros everywhere else." A nearly completely decomposable matrix is one where an identical rearrangement of rows and columns leaves a set of square submatrices on the principal diagonal and small nonzeros everywhere else.

Example

A Markov chain with transition matrix

is nearly completely decomposable if ε is small (say 0.1).

Stationary distribution algorithms

Special-purpose iterative algorithms have been designed for NCD Markov chains though the multi–level algorithm, a general purpose algorithm, has been shown experimentally to be competitive and in some cases significantly faster.

See also

 Lumpability

References

Markov processes